Pradeep is a Diya lamp, used in Puja (religious ceremonies) in Hinduism, Jainism, & Buddhism. It is related to the name Pradip.

Notable people with the name include:

 Pradeep Dahal
 Pradeep (actor)
 Kavi Pradeep
 Vidya Pradeep
 Pradeep Kumar
 Pradeep Kumar (musician)
 G. S. Pradeep
 Pradeep Machiraju
 Pradeep Rawat (actor)
 Pradeep Sharma
 Pradeep Pandey
 Pradeep Shakthi
 Pradeep Sarkar
 Pradeep Sindhu
 Pradeep E. Ragav
 Pradeep Kumar Sinha
 Pradeep Khosla
 Pradeep John
 Deepu Pradeep
 Pradeep Mathur
 Pappachen Pradeep
 Badekkila Pradeep
 Deepu Pradeep
 Pradeep Chandran Nair
 Pradeep (Malayalam actor)
 Pradeep Kumar (politician)
 Pradeep Yadav (Nepalese politician)
 Pradeep Yadav (Indian politician)
 Pradeep Yadav (cricketer)
 Prithvirajsing Roopun (Pradeep Roopun)
 Pradeep Tamta
 Pradeep Singh Sihag
 Pradeep Shettar
 Pradeep Kumar (producer)
 Pradeep Jaiswal
 Pradeep Palluruthy
 Nuwan Pradeep
 RJ Pradeep

References